Yanshan may refer to:

Places
Yanshan County, Hebei
Yanshan County, Jiangxi
Yanshan County, Yunnan
Yanshan District, Guilin, Guangxi
Yanshan Subdistrict, in Yanshan District
Yanshan Avenue Subdistrict, Haigang District, Qinhuangdao, Hebei
Area
Yanshan, Beijing, in Fangshan District, Beijing
Towns
Yanshan Town, Guangxi, in Yanshan District
Yanshan, Guizhou, in Wuchuan Gelao and Miao Autonomous County
Yanshan, Cangzhou, seat of Yanshan County, Hebei
Yanshan, Heilongjiang, in Fujin City

Others
Yan Mountains, mountain range to the north of the North China Plain
Yanshan Temple, in Fanzhi County, Shanxi
Yanshan University, in Qinhuangdao, Hebei